Tado (formerly Ezame) is a village in south east Togo, near the border with Benin.

Tradition states that Tado was the birthplace of the Aja people at some point in the 12th or 13th century.  Today the Aja populate the south part of Togo and Benin.  It is also the reputed birthplace of Gangnihessou, the first king of Dahomey, in the 16th century.

Today Tado is a centre of pilgrimage for Aja people from across the region, who visit the village each August to pray for their ancestral spirits.

See also
Gbe languages, History section

External links
A brief history of Tado

Populated places in Plateaux Region, Togo
History of Africa